Willi Semmler is a German born American economist who currently teaches at The New School in New York.

Academic career 
Willi Semmler studied at the University of Munich, Technical University of Berlin and Free University of Berlin. He has a PHD (Dr. rer pol) and a Habilitation from the Free University of Berlin. He began his teaching career at the University of Berlin, was a Post-Doc at Columbia University, funded by the American Council of Learned Society, taught at the American University, Washington, D.C., and the University of Bielefeld, (Germany). He is currently the Henry Arnhold Professor of International Cooperation and Development at the New School for Social Research, The New School, New York. He was research fellow at the ZEW Mannheim and is Senior Researcher at the IIASA, Laxenburg, Austria. He was visitor at the CEPREMAP, Paris, Stanford University, and Japanese Universities.

Theoretical contributions 
Semmler's dissertation was on Multisector Growth Theory. His research topics include Classical Economic Dynamics, Business Cycles, Macroeconomic Dynamics, Economic Growth, Global Growth, Environment, and Resources, Macroeconomics and Finance, Financial Economics, the Economics of Climate Change, Empirical Macroeconomics and Regime Switching Models, and Numerical Methods in Economics.

Applied work 
US and EU macroeconomics, and monetary and fiscal policy, disparities in income and wealth distribution, dynamic portfolio decisions, financing climate policies, climate policies and green jobs, empirics of nonrenewable and renewable energy, and economic comments in Spiegel Online, see External Links. Semmler’s policy research has also been featured in working paper series of the World Bank, IMF, ECB, and ILO.

Awards and Grants 
Grant from the German Research Foundation, on Macroeconomics and Inequality, August 2015 – 2016

Grant from the German Research Foundation jointly with Stephan Klasen, on Infrastructure against Climate Risk, August 2012 – 2013, extension 2015-2016

Thyssen Foundation grant for a two year speaker series on Global Warming and Renewable Energy, August 2012-August 2014, extension 2015-2020

One year grant from the Center for European Economics Research (ZEW), Mannheim, on a research project on Financial Stress and Economic Dynamics: Asymmetries within and Across European Countries, June 2012-June 2013

Fulbright Professorship, University of Economics, Vienna, 2012

Grant from the Walker Foundation on "The Economics of Global Warming II: Renewable Energy", September 2011

Publications 

 Using Nonlinear Model Predictive Control for Dynamic Decision Problems in Economics(with L. Gruene and M. Stieler), Journal of Economic Dynamics and Control, 60:112 133, 2015.
 Handbook on the Macroeconomics of Global Warming (edited with L. Bernard), Oxford University Press, 2015.
 The Real Consequences of Financial Stress (with S. Mittnik), Journal of Economic Dynamics and Control, vol. 37, no: 8, 2013.
 Asset Prices, Booms and Recessions, Financial Economics from a Dynamic Perspective, and Sustainable Asset Accumulation and Dynamic Portfolio decisions (2016), both Springer Publishing House. 2011.
 Filtering Time Series with Penalized Splines (with G. Kauermann and T. Krivobokova), Studies in Nonlinear Dynamics and Econometrics, vol 15, no:21-26, 2011;
 The US Wage Phillips Curve Across Frequencies and Over Time (with M. Gallegati, M. Gallegati, J. Ramsey), Oxford Bulletin of Economics and Statistics, vol. 73. no 4: 489-508. 2011.
 Financial Assets, debt and Liquidity Crisis (with M. Charpe, C. Chiarella, and P. Flaschel), Cambridge University Press, 2011.
 Global Environment, Natural Resources, and Economic Growth (with A. Greiner), Oxford University Press, 2008.
 The Forces of Economic Growth, A Time Series Perspective (with A. Greiner and G. Gong), Princeton University Press, 2005 (paper back 2016).
 Dynamic Macroeconomics, Instability, Fluctuations, and Growth in a Monetary Economy (with P. Flaschel and R. Franke), MIT Press, 1997.
 On Nonlinear Theories of Economic Cycles and the Persistence of Business Cycles, Journal of Mathematical Social Sciences, vol. 12, no 1, pp. 123–147, 1986.
 The Classical and Neoclassical Competitive Adjustment Processes (with P. Flaschel), The Manchester School of Economic and Social Studies 55(1):13-37, March, 1987.
 Zur Theorie der Reproduktion und Akkumulation. Bemerkungen zu neueren multisektoralen Ansätzen sowie Überlegungen zum Verhältnis von privatem und staatlichem Sektor, Free University of Berlin, published in German at Wolter Verlag Berlin. 1977.

References

External links

German economists
Economists from New York (state)
Technical University of Berlin alumni
Free University of Berlin alumni
Ludwig Maximilian University of Munich alumni
The New School faculty
German emigrants to the United States
1942 births
Living people
21st-century American economists